Jawali is a village in Pali district of Rajasthan, India. It is located 40.1 km distance from its District headquarters, Pali

Jawali also is a railway station between Palanpur Junction and Marwar Junction. The station falls under Rani Station jurisdiction, which is located 15 km away.

References 

Villages in Pali district